Mkpat-Enin is located in the South South region of Nigeria and is a town and a Local Government Area (LGA) of Akwa Ibom State.

The LGA is located within the industrial belt extending from Eastern Obolo, Etinan, Oruk Anam, Onna, to Ikot Abasi. The people are traditionally Ibibio speakers. The population was 178,036 based on the 2006 census. The area is rich in oil and natural gas; oil was discovered in Ikot Akpa/Ekop as early as 1953. Forest reserves in the local government area include timber and palm produce.

One of the campuses of the Akwa Ibom State University of Technology is located in this community.

The LGA has four clans and 87 villages: The Present Executive Chairman of Mkpat Enin LGA is Hon. (Prince) Anieokpon E. Ekpo

It is part of the Ikot Abasi / Mkpat Enin / Eastern Obolo Constituency of the Nigerian House of Representatives.
It is within the Catholic Diocese of Uyo.

Economy 
Mkpat Enin LGA is wealthy in stores of raw petroleum and flammable gas and the exercises of neighborhood and worldwide oil mining firms in the LGA contributes monstrously to the financial advancement of the area. Fishing is likewise a basic part of the economy of Mkpat enin LGA with the area's waterways and streams being wealthy in fish. Cultivating likewise prospers in Mkpat enin LGA with harvests, for example, plantain and vegetables filled nearby.

References

Local Government Areas in Akwa Ibom State
Towns in Akwa Ibom State